The term six-stroke engine has been applied to a number of alternative internal combustion engine designs that attempt to improve on traditional two-stroke and four-stroke engines.  Claimed advantages may include increased fuel efficiency, reduced mechanical complexity, and/or reduced emissions.  These engines can be divided into two groups based on the number of pistons that contribute to the six strokes.

In the single-piston designs, the engine captures the heat lost from the four-stroke Otto cycle or Diesel cycle and uses it to drive an additional power and exhaust stroke of the piston in the same cylinder in an attempt to improve fuel efficiency and/or assist with engine cooling.  The pistons in this type of six-stroke engine go up and down three times for each injection of fuel.  These designs use either steam or air as the working fluid for the additional power stroke.

The designs in which the six strokes are determined by the interactions between two pistons are more diverse.  The pistons may be opposed in a single cylinder or may reside in separate cylinders.  Usually, one cylinder makes two strokes while the other makes four strokes, giving six piston movements per cycle.  The second piston may be used to replace the valve mechanism of a conventional engine, which may reduce mechanical complexity and enable an increased compression ratio by eliminating hotspots that would otherwise limit compression.  The second piston may also be used to increase the expansion ratio, decoupling it from the compression ratio.  Increasing the expansion ratio in this way can increase thermodynamic efficiency in a similar manner to the Miller or Atkinson cycle.

Seven-stroke Engine 
The term seven-stroke engine has been applied to a number of alternative internal combustion engine designs that attempt to improve on five-stroke engines.  Claimed advantages may include increased fuel efficiency, reduced mechanical complexity, and/or reduced emissions.  These engines can be divided into two groups based on the number of pistons that contribute to the six strokes. Seven-stroke engine have similar like five-stroke but with addition two-strokes extra.
Seven-stroke engine how to work:
Intake stroke
Compression stroke
Power stroke
Extended expansion
Exhaust stroke
Air intake
Air exhaust

Seven-stroke engine with three-cylinder similar like five-stroke and with HP (High Pressure) cylinder and LP (Low Pressure) cylinder.

Engine types

Single-piston designs
These designs use a single piston per cylinder, like a conventional two- or four-stroke engine. A secondary, nondetonating fluid is injected into the chamber, and the leftover heat from combustion causes it to expand for a second power stroke followed by a second exhaust stroke.

Griffin six-stroke engine

In 1883, the Bath-based engineer Samuel Griffin was an established maker of steam and gas engines. He wished to produce an internal combustion engine, but without paying the licensing costs of the Otto patents. His solution was to develop a "patent slide valve" and a single-acting six-stroke engine using it.
By 1886, Scottish steam locomotive maker Dick, Kerr & Co. saw a future in large oil engines and licensed the Griffin patents. These were double-acting, tandem engines and sold under the name "Kilmarnock". A major market for the Griffin engine was in electricity generation, where they developed a reputation for happily running light for long periods, then suddenly being able to take up a large demand for power. Their large, heavy construction did not suit them to mobile use, but they were capable of burning heavier and cheaper grades of oil. 
The key principle of the "Griffin Simplex" was a heated, exhaust-jacketed external vapouriser, into which the fuel was sprayed. This fractional distillation supported the use of heavy oil fuels, the unusable tars and asphalts separating out in the vapouriser.
Hot-bulb ignition was used, which Griffin termed the "catathermic igniter", a small isolated cavity connected to the combustion chamber. The spray injector had an adjustable inner nozzle for the air supply, surrounded by an annular casing for the oil, both oil and air entering at  pressure, and being regulated by a governor.
Griffin went out of business in 1923.
Only two known examples of a Griffin six-stroke engine survive. One is in the Anson Engine Museum. The other was built in 1885 and for some years was in the Birmingham Museum of Science and Technology, but in 2007, it returned to Bath and the Museum of Bath at Work.

Dyer six-stroke engine
Leonard Dyer invented a six-stroke, internal combustion, water-injection engine in 1915, very similar to Crower's design (see below). A dozen more similar patents have been issued since.

Dyer's six-stroke engine features:
 No cooling system required
 Improves a typical engine's fuel consumption
 Requires a supply of pure water to act as the medium for the second power stroke.
 Extracts the additional power from the expansion of steam.

Bajulaz six-stroke engine
The Bajulaz six-stroke engine is similar to a regular combustion engine in design, but modifications were made to the cylinder head, with two supplementary fixed-capacity chambers: a combustion chamber and an air-preheating chamber above each cylinder. The combustion chamber receives a charge of heated air from the cylinder; the injection of fuel begins an isochoric (constant-volume) burn, which increases the thermal efficiency compared to a burn in the cylinder. The high pressure achieved is then released into the cylinder to work the power or expansion stroke. Meanwhile, a second chamber, which blankets the combustion chamber, has its air content heated to a high degree by heat passing through the cylinder wall.  This heated and pressurized air is then used to power an additional stroke of the piston.

The claimed advantages of the engine include reduction in fuel consumption by at least 40%, two expansion strokes in six strokes, multiple-fuel usage capability, and a dramatic reduction in pollution.

The Bajulaz six-stroke engine features claimed are:
Reduction in fuel consumption by at least 40%
Two expansion (work) strokes in six strokes
Multifuel, including liquefied petroleum gas
Dramatic reduction in air pollution
Costs comparable to those of a four-stroke engine

Velozeta six-stroke engine
In a Velozeta engine, fresh air is injected into the cylinder during the exhaust stroke, which expands by heat and therefore forces the piston down for an additional stroke. The valve overlaps have been removed, and the two additional strokes using air injection provide for better gas scavenging. The engine seems to show 40% reduction in fuel consumption and dramatic reduction in air pollution. Its power-to-weight ratio is slightly less than that of a four-stroke gasoline engine. The engine can run on a variety of fuels, ranging from gasoline and diesel fuel to LPG. An altered engine shows a 65% reduction in carbon monoxide pollution when compared with the four-stroke engine from which it was developed. The engine was developed in 2005 by a team of mechanical engineering students, U Krishnaraj,  Boby Sebastian,  Arun Nair, and  Aaron Joseph George of the College of Engineering, Trivandrum.

NIYKADO six-stroke engine
This engine was developed by Chanayil Cleetus Anil, of Cochin, India, who patented the design in 2012.  The name of the engine is taken from the name of his company, NIYKADO Motors. The engine underwent a preliminary round of full-throttle tests at the Automotive Research Association of India, Pune. The inventor claims this engine "is 23% more fuel efficient compared to a conventional four-stroke engine" and it is "very low on pollution".

Anil, a mechanic, developed the NIYKADO engine over the course more than 15 years. The engine was first tested in 2004 and Anil applied for his patent in 2005. He claims that his design produces  drastically less pollution and that use in the automotive industry could lead to "emission-less mobility."

Engine functionality:

The different strokes are:
Intake stroke
Compression stroke
Power stroke
Exhaust stroke
Air intake
Air exhaust

The engine has four valves:
 Air-fuel intake valve
 Air-only intake valve
 Combustion exhaust valve
 Air-only exhaust valve

Intake stroke: In this stroke, the piston moves from top dead center (TDC) to bottom dead center (BDC). The intake valve opens and the air-fuel mixture enters the cylinder.

Compression stroke: The piston moves from BDC to TDC, and all valves are closed.

Power stroke: The spark plug ignites the air-fuel mixture. The piston moves from TDC to BDC, while all valves remain closed.

Exhaust stroke: The piston moves from BDC to TDC while the exhaust valve opens, allowing exhaust gases to exit the cylinder.

Air intake stroke: The air-only intake valve opens while the piston moves from TDC to BDC, pulling fresh air from the atmosphere into the cylinder. This air mixes with any leftover exhaust or unburnt fuel, while cooling the inside of the cylinder.

Air exhaust stroke: The air exhaust valve opens while the piston moves from BDC to TDC. The fresh air and most of the leftover fuel and exhaust leave the cylinder. Anil claims that this creates a fresher atmosphere inside the cylinder before the next air-fuel intake stroke, helps the engine to burn almost 100% of the air-fuel mixture, and reduces harmful emissions (including a 98% reduction in carbon monoxide emissions).

Crower six-stroke engine 
In a six-stroke engine prototyped in the United States by Bruce Crower, water is injected into the cylinder after the exhaust stroke and is instantly turned to steam, which expands and forces the piston down for an additional power stroke. Thus, waste heat that requires an air or water cooling system to discharge in most engines is captured and put to use driving the piston. Crower estimated that his design would reduce fuel consumption by 40% by generating the same power output at a lower rotational speed. The weight associated with a cooling system could be eliminated, but that would be balanced by a need for a water tank in addition to the normal fuel tank.

The Crower six-stroke engine was an experimental design that attracted media attention in 2006 because of an interview given by the 75-year-old American inventor, who has applied for a patent on his design.  That patent application was subsequently abandoned.

Opposed-piston designs
These designs use two pistons per cylinder operating at different rates, with combustion occurring between the pistons.

Beare head
This design was developed by Malcolm Beare of Australia. The technology combines a four-stroke engine bottom end with an opposed piston in the cylinder head working at half the cyclical rate of the bottom piston. Functionally, the second piston replaces the valve mechanism of a conventional engine.  Claimed benefits include a 9% increase in power, and improved thermodynamic efficiency through an increased compression ratio enabled by the elimination of the hot exhaust valve.

M4+2

The idea was developed at the Silesian University of Technology, Poland, under the leadership of dr inż. Adam Ciesiołkiewicz. It was granted patent nr 195052 by the Polish Patent Office.

The M4+2 engines have much in common with the Beare-head engines, combining two opposed pistons in the same cylinder. One piston works at half the cyclical rate of the other, but while the main function of the second piston in a Beare-head engine is to replace the valve mechanism of a conventional four-stroke engine, the M4+2 takes the principle one step further.  The double-piston combustion engine's work is based on the cooperation of both modules. The air load change takes place in the two-stroke section of the engine. The piston of the four-stroke section is an air load exchange aiding system, working as a system of valves. The cylinder is filled with air or with an air-fuel mixture. The filling process takes place at overpressure by the slide inlet system. The exhaust gases are removed as in the classical two-stroke engine, by exhaust windows in the cylinder. The fuel is supplied into the cylinder by a fuel-injection system. Ignition is realized by two spark plugs. The effective power output of the double-piston engine is transferred by two crankshafts. The characteristic feature of this engine is an opportunity of continuous change of cylinder capacity and compression rate during engine work by changing the piston's location. The mechanical and thermodynamical models were meant for double-piston engines, which enable to draw up new theoretical thermodynamic cycle for internal combustion double-pistons engine.

The working principle of the engine is explained in the two- and four-stroke engines article.

Other two-piston designs

Piston-charger engine

In this engine, similar in design to the Beare head, a "piston charger" replaces the valve system. The piston charger charges the main cylinder and simultaneously regulates the inlet and the outlet aperture, leading to no loss of air and fuel in the exhaust. In the main cylinder, combustion takes place every turn as in a two-stroke engine, while lubrication is achieved in the same manner as in a four-stroke. Fuel injection can take place in the piston charger, in the gas-transfer channel or in the combustion chamber. It is also possible to charge two working cylinders with one piston charger. The combination of compact design for the combustion chamber together with no loss of air and fuel is claimed to give the engine more torque, more power and better fuel efficiency. The benefit of fewer moving parts and design is claimed to lead to lower manufacturing costs. The engine is claimed to be suited to alternative fuels since no corrosion or deposits are left on valves.
The six strokes are:
 Aspiration
 Precompression
 Gas transfer
 Compression
 Ignition
 Ejection.
This is an invention of Helmut Kottmann from Germany, while working 25 years at MAHLE GmbH piston and cylinder construction. Kottman's US patents 3921608 and 5755191 are listed below.

Ilmor/Schmitz five-stroke
This design was invented by Belgian engineer Gerhard Schmitz, and has been prototyped by Ilmor Engineering.

These designs use two (or four, six, or eight) cylinders with a conventional Otto four-stroke cycle. An additional piston (in its own cylinder) is shared by the two Otto-cycle cylinders.  The exhaust from the Otto-cycle cylinder is directed into the shared cylinder, where it is expanded, generating additional work.  This is in some respects similar to the operation of a compound steam engine, with the Otto-cycle cylinders being the high-pressure stage and the shared cylinder the low-pressure stage.  The operation of the engine is:

The designers consider this to be a five-stroke design, regarding the simultaneous HP exhaust stroke and LP expansion stroke as a single stroke.  This design provides higher fuel efficiency due to the higher overall expansion ratio of the combined cylinders.  Expansion ratios comparable to diesel engines can be achieved, while still using gasoline (petrol) fuel.   Five-stroke engines allegedly are lighter and have higher power density than diesel engines.

Revetec engines
The controlled combustion engines, designed by Bradley Howell-Smith of Australian firm Revetec Holdings Pty Ltd, use opposed pairs of pistons to drive a pair of counter-rotating, three-lobed cams through bearings.  These elements replace the conventional crankshaft and connecting rods, which enable the motion of the pistons to be purely axial, so that most of the power otherwise wasted on lateral motion of the con rods is effectively transferred to the output shaft.  This gives six power strokes per revolution of the shaft (spread across a pair of pistons).  An independent test measured the brake specific fuel consumption of Revetec's X4v2 prototype gasoline engine at 212g/kW-h (corresponding to an energy efficiency of 38.6%).  Any even number of pistons can be used, in boxer or X configurations; the three lobes of the cams can be replaced by any other odd number greater than one; and the geometry of the cams can be changed to suit the needs of the target fuels and applications of the engines.  Such variants may have 10 or more strokes per cycle.

Related patents

Related U.S. patents
  Internal combustion and steam engine Feb 27, 1917. Hugo F. Liedtke seems to be one of the first to contemplate alternating between internal combustion and steam injection into the combustion chamber.
  Internal combustion engine May 4, 1920. Leonard H. Dyer invented the first 6-stroke internal combustion/water-injection engine in 1915.
  Internal Combustion Engine Jul 30, 1940
  Two-stroke internal combustion engine Nov 25, 1975
  Six cycle combustion and fluid vaporization engine Jun 22, 1976
  Internal combustion and steam engine Mar 13, 1979
  Combination internal combustion and steam engine Nov 24, 1981
  Combination internal combustion and steam engine Feb 28, 1984
  Compound internal combustion engine and method for its use Dec 25, 1984
  Compound internal combustion engine and method for its use Dec 25, 1984
  Engine with a six-stroke cycle, variable compression ratio, and constant stroke Apr 12, 1988
  Six-stroke internal combustion engine Apr 17, 1990
  Six-stroke internal combustion engine May 15, 1990
  Two-stroke internal combustion engine with charging cylinder May 26, 1998
  Multiple stroke engine having fuel and vapor charges Jul 3, 2001
  Computer-controlled six-stroke internal combustion engine and its method of operation Nov 6, 2001
  Computer-controlled six-stroke cycle internal combustion engine and its method of operation Jun 3, 2003
  Computer controlled multi-stroke cycle power generating assembly and method of operation Apr 4, 2006

Related Indian patents
 IN patent 252642 Six Stroke Engine May 25, 2012

Related Polish patents
 Bulletin of the Polish Patent Office, No 12(664)1999 p. 53, Pat. No P323508 "the working principle of an internal combustion of multistroke engine" (by Antoni Gnoiński, constructor from Będzin, Poland)

References

External links
Bajulaz Six-Stroke Engine  Accessed June 2007
Bajulaz Animation Accessed June 2007
Beare Six-Stroke Engine
Video by the inventor of the NIYKADO Six Stroke Engine
Ilmor prototype five-stroke engine

Internal combustion piston engines
Engine technology
Piston engines